Koufu may refer to:
Koufu, a Zhou noble
 Kōfu, Yamanashi, in Japan
Koufu (company), a Singaporean food court chain